Kamola Irnazarova (born 25 April 2002 in Tashkent) is an Uzbekistani group rhythmic gymnast who represented Uzbekistan at the 2020 Summer Olympics.

Career 
She represented her country at the 2018 World Rhythmic Gymnastics Championships, and 2019 World Rhythmic Gymnastics Championships,

Irnazarova was part of the Uzbekistani group that won the all-around at the 2021 Asian Championships, also taking the gold in both the 5 balls and 4 clubs + 3 hoops finals.

At the 2020 Olympic Games, she competed alongside Kseniia Aleksandrova, Dinara Ravshanbekova, Sevara Safoeva, and Nilufar Shomuradova. They finished ninth in the qualification round for the group all-around and were the first reserve for the final.

References

External links 
 

Living people
2002 births
Uzbekistani rhythmic gymnasts
Gymnasts at the 2020 Summer Olympics
Olympic gymnasts of Uzbekistan
Sportspeople from Tashkent
21st-century Uzbekistani women